Joseph Arthur Costello (May 9, 1915 – September 22, 1978) was a Roman Catholic bishop of the Catholic Church in the United States who served as an auxiliary bishop of the Archdiocese of Newark, New Jersey from 1963 to 1978.

Biography
Born in Newark, New Jersey, Joseph Costello was ordained a priest for the Archdiocese of Newark on June 7, 1941.

On November 17, 1962 Pope John XXIII appointed Costello as the Titular Bishop of ‘’Choma’’ and Auxiliary Bishop of Newark.  He was consecrated a bishop by Archbishop Thomas Boland on January 24, 1963. The principal co-consecrators were Bishop James McNulty of Paterson and Newark Auxiliary Bishop Martin Stanton.

Costello attended three of the four sessions of the Second Vatican Council (1962-1965). He continued to serve as an auxiliary bishop until his death at the age of 63 on September 22, 1978.

References

1915 births
1978 deaths
Clergy from Newark, New Jersey
20th-century American Roman Catholic titular bishops
Participants in the Second Vatican Council